Triphysaria micrantha is a species of flowering plant in the family Orobanchaceae known by the common name purplebeak owl's-clover. It is endemic to California, where it is known from the grasslands of the Central Valley and the foothills to the east and west. It an annual herb producing a hairy, glandular, purple-colored stem up to about 15 centimeters in maximum height. Like many species in its family it is a facultative root parasite on other plants, attaching to their roots via haustoria to tap nutrients. Its greenish to red-purple leaves are up to 2.5 centimeters long and are sometimes divided into a few narrow, pointed lobes. The inflorescence is a spike of flowers a few centimeters in length. Each flower has a narrow purple upper lip and a wide lower lip which is divided into yellowish or white pouches, often with purple markings on the lower parts.

References

External links
Jepson Manual Treatment
Photo gallery

Orobanchaceae
Endemic flora of California
Flora without expected TNC conservation status